Noroton Heights is a village and census-designated place (CDP) in the town of Darien, Connecticut, United States. The community is located on Connecticut's Gold Coast. As of the 2020 census, the CDP has a population of 3,116.

Noroton Heights is bordered by Stamford to the west, Noroton to the south, and downtown Darien to the northeast. It primarily serves as a bedroom community to office centers in Stamford, Norwalk, and Manhattan. Noroton is served by Exits 10 and 11 on Interstate 95. A 49-minute commute to Manhattan is offered at the Metro-North train station located downtown.

Noroton Heights has some of the most expensive residential real estate in Connecticut, especially along Wee Burn Country Club. The public schools are consistently ranked as some of the highest performing schools in the country. Darien's secondary schools, Middlesex Middle School and Darien High School, are generally ranked near the top for the state of Connecticut and are both in Noroton Heights.

References 

Census-designated places in Fairfield County, Connecticut
Census-designated places in Connecticut